Russians (rusnatsi) form the fourth largest ethnic group in Bulgaria, numbering 31,679 in 2019, and mostly living in the large urban centres, such as Sofia, Plovdiv, Varna and Burgas. Although the largest wave of Russian settlers (White Guards) arrived following the events surrounding the October Revolution and the Russian Civil War, compact groups of Russians had been living in Bulgaria for centuries before that.

Among the early Russian settlers were Old Believer Nekrasov Cossacks, some of which founded the village of Tataritsa in then-Ottoman-ruled Southern Dobruja (nowadays part of the village of Aydemir in Silistra Province) in 1674, building a church in 1750. Another Russian-inhabited village in the northeast of Bulgaria is Kazashko in Varna Province, where descendants of Kuban and Don Cossacks have been living since 1905. The members of these Old Believer communities are locally known as Lipovans (липованци, lipovantsi) and belong to a group also inhabiting Romania and Ukraine. Their main occupation is fishing, in the Danube for the Lipovans in Tataritsa and in Lake Varna for those in Kazashko.

Following the Russo-Turkish War of 1877-78, largely fought on what is today Bulgarian territory, and the Liberation of Bulgaria to which it led in 1878, a transitional Russian administration was established with Prince Alexander Mikhailovich Dondukov-Korsakov as its head.

Following their defeat by the Red Guards in the Russian Civil War, many White Guards fled to Bulgaria (then a monarchy) seeking refuge. They initially numbered around 24–29,000, but some 4,000 received amnesty and returned to the Soviet Union and many others were expelled under Aleksandar Stamboliyski. With Bulgaria becoming part of the Eastern bloc following World War II, a number of Russians emigrated to the country. Today, foreign (including Russian) businessmen living in Bulgaria are eligible for Bulgarian passport under specific conditions (such as investing over $250,000 or running a business, and having a clean slate).

Nowadays, Russians in Bulgaria are represented by a number of organizations, such as Soyuz sootechestvenikov (Union of Compatriots), the Union of Russian Citizens and the Society of White Guardsmen.

See also  
 Bulgaria–Russia relations
 Demographics of Bulgaria
 Russian diaspora
 White émigré
 Russians in Greece
 Russians in Serbia

References

 
 
 
 Peykovska, P.War and Migration in Bulgaria from 1912 to 1926, 2017
Пейковска, П. Демографски аспекти на миграциите в България, 1912-1944, 2019

External links
 Информационный форум о Болгарии по-русски: все об иммиграции, недвижимости, отдыхе и туризме. 
 Russian embassy in Bulgaria 

Ethnic groups in Bulgaria
Bulgaria
Bulgaria–Russia relations
 
Russian diaspora in Europe